Below is a list of High Sheriffs of Cambridgeshire and Isle of Ely since the creation of that county in 1965 until its abolition in 1974:

Before 1965 see Sheriff of Cambridgeshire and Huntingdonshire
1965–1966: Francis Wingate William Pemberton, of Trumpington Hall, Cambridge.
1966–1967: Colonel John Goodwyn Allden Beckett, OBE, TD, of "Mallabar's", Brays Lane, Ely.
1967–1968: John Jacob Astor, MBE, of Hatley Park, Hatley St. George, Sandy, Bedfordshire.
1968–1969: Commander Alfred Francis Colenso Gray, RD, RNR, of 54 Wimblington Road, March.
1969–1970: Arthur Gregory George Marshall, OBE, of Horseheath Lodge, Linton, Cambridge.
1970–1971: James Gee Pascoe Crowden, of Little Needham, 75 Harecroft Road, Wisbech.
1971–1972: Colonel Douglas Robert Beaumont Kaye, DSO, of Brinkley Hall, Newmarket
1972–1973: Edwin Harrison Morris, of Ancaster Farm, Stonea, near March.
1973–1974: Sir (Alfred) Stanley Fordham, KBE, CMG, of Melbourn Bury, near Royston, Herts.
 After 1974 see High Sheriff of Cambridgeshire

References

Cambridgeshire and Isle of Ely
History of Cambridgeshire
Local government in Cambridgeshire